The 1993 New York City mayoral election was held on Tuesday, November 2. Incumbent Mayor David Dinkins ran for re-election to a second term, but lost in a rematch with Republican Rudy Giuliani.

History
Dinkins had narrowly defeated Giuliani in the previous election. As in his unsuccessful 1989 campaign, Giuliani also ran on the Liberal Party ballot, while the Conservative Party line was held by activist George Marlin. The city was suffering from a spike in unemployment associated with a nationwide recession, and with a rise in local unemployment rates from 6.7% in 1989 to 11.1% in 1992. Citing broken windows theory, Giuliani promised to focus the police department on shutting down petty crimes and nuisances as a way of restoring the quality of life: 

Although crime had begun to fall during the Dinkins administration, the city's crime rate was a key issue in the 1993 election, with Dinkins suffering badly from a perception that crime was uncontrolled in the city, possibly because of events such as the Crown Heights riot, as well as the Family Red Apple boycott. The year prior to the election, Giuliani was a key speaker at a Patrolmen's Benevolent Association rally opposing Dinkins, in which Giuliani said “The reason the morale of the police department of the City of New York is so low is one reason and one reason alone: David Dinkins!” The rally quickly devolved into a riot, with nearly 4,000 off-duty police officers storming the City Hall and blocking traffic on the Brooklyn Bridge.

Dinkins and Giuliani never debated during the campaign, unable to agree on how to approach a debate. Dinkins wanted to share the debate stage with third-party candidates, while Giuliani did not.

Jimmy McMillan, the founder of the Rent Is Too Damn High Party, made his first run for political office in this election. In the course of his campaign, McMillan was at one point tied to a tree and doused with gasoline; he would later climb the Brooklyn Bridge and refuse to come down from it unless television stations broadcast his message. He was ultimately disqualified from the ballot for coming 300 petition signatures short of the 7,500 needed to qualify for the general election ballot.

Dinkins was endorsed by The New York Times and Newsday, while Giuliani was endorsed by the New York Post and, in a key switch from 1989, the New York Daily News.  

On election day, Giuliani’s campaign hired off-duty cops, firefighters, and corrections officers to monitor polling places in Manhattan, Brooklyn, and The Bronx for cases of voter fraud. Despite objections from the Dinkins campaign, who claimed that the effort would intimidate Democratic voters, Police Commissioner Ray Kelly assigned an additional 52 police captains and 3,500 officers to monitor the city’s polling places.

Candidates
Rudy Giuliani – Republican Party (WON)
David Dinkins (incumbent) – Democratic Party
George J. Marlin – Conservative Party

Results
Dinkins earned 48.3 percent of the vote, down from 51 percent in 1989. Although he was a moderate with a substantial history of building coalitions and supporting Jewish causes, one factor in Dinkins' loss was his perceived indifference to the plight of the Jewish community during the Crown Heights riot. Another was a strong turnout for Giuliani in Staten Island; a referendum on Staten Island's secession from New York City was placed on the ballot that year by Governor Mario Cuomo and the New York State Legislature. Dinkins defeated Giuliani handily in Manhattan, the Bronx, with a narrow victory in Brooklyn, however Giuliani's margin in the other two boroughs was large enough to win the election. Giuliani won by a margin of 53,367 votes. He became the first Republican elected Mayor of New York City since John Lindsay in 1965.

| ||||||||||||

References

Mayoral election, 1993
New York City mayoral
New York
1993
November 1993 events in the United States
Rudy Giuliani